The 1937 Pittsburgh Americans season was their second and final season in existence. The team played in the American Football League would go on to post a 1-3 record overall, and a 0-3 league record, before folding halfway through the season.

Schedule

Game notes

Final league standings

References
Pro Football Archives: 1937 Pittsburgh Americans season

Pittsburgh Americans seasons
Pittsburgh